Generous is an adjective form of generosity.

Generous may also refer to:

 Generous (horse), an Irish thoroughbred racehorse
 "Generous" (song), a 2017 song by Olivia Holt
 Generous Stakes, an American thoroughbred horse race
 Matt Generous (born 1985), an American ice hockey defenseman 
 The Generous, a Japanese musical duo

See also 
 List of people known as the Generous